Virac Airport (Bikol: Palayogan nin Virac)  is the only airport serving the island province of Catanduanes in the Philippines.  It is located in the capital, Virac. The airport is classified as a Class 1 principal (major domestic) airport by the Civil Aviation Authority of the Philippines, a body of the Department of Transportation that is responsible for the operations of not only this airport but also of all other airports in the Philippines except the major international airports.

On October 27, 2013, Cebu Pacific launched the first ever Airbus flight in Virac.

Airlines and destinations

Airport Redevelopment Project
The project is the Rehabilitation of Virac Airport with the goal expanding its passenger terminal area in order to cater to the growing number of passengers and cargo that fly in and out of Catanduanes. The project derives its funds from CAAP or the Civil Aviation Authority of the Philippines.

 Modernization of Airport Terminal and Facilities
 Asphalt overlay of runway (30mx1,886m) - approved budget 105.13 million pesos

See also
List of airports in the Philippines

References

External links
World Aero Data - Virac Airport (VRC) Details

Airports in the Philippines
Buildings and structures in Catanduanes